Executive Order 13356 is a United States Presidential Executive Order signed on August 27, 2004, by President George W. Bush.
Its goal was "Strengthening the Sharing of Terrorism Information To Protect Americans". It was supplemented by and partially superseded Executive Order 13388.

Section 1 of the executive order lays out a policy change, instructing the directors of US intelligence agencies:

Later sections of the Executive Order specified the details of how the directors of intelligence agencies should implement this policy change.

References

American intelligence gathering law
Executive orders of George W. Bush